The 2000 NatWest Series was a One Day International cricket tri-series sponsored by the National Westminster Bank that took place in England between 6 and 22 July 2000. The series involved the national teams of England, West Indies and Zimbabwe. Ten matches were played in total, with each team playing one another thrice during the group stage. The teams which finished in the top two positions following the group stages qualified for the final, which England won by defeating Zimbabwe at Lord's on 22 July by 7 wickets. Preceding the series, England played Zimbabwe in a two Test series, while following the series, 2000 Frank Worrell series continued.

Venues

Squads

Fixtures

Pool matches

1st ODI

2nd ODI

3rd ODI

4th ODI

5th ODI

6th ODI

7th ODI

8th ODI

9th ODI

Final

10th ODI

References

External links 
 2000 NatWest Series at ESPNcricinfo

2000 in English cricket
International cricket competitions in 2000
NatWest Group